The Football Association Challenge Cup, commonly known as the FA Cup, is a knockout competition in English football, organised by and named after The Football Association (the FA). It is the oldest existing football competition in the world, having commenced in the 1871–72 season. The tournament is open to all clubs in the top 10 levels of the English football league system, although a club's home stadium must meet certain requirements prior to entering the tournament. The competition culminates at the end of the league season (usually in May) with the FA Cup Final, officially named The Football Association Challenge Cup Final Tie, which has traditionally been regarded as the showpiece finale of the English football season.

The vast majority of FA Cup final matches have been in London: most of these were played at the original Wembley Stadium, which was used from 1923 until the stadium closed in 2000. The other venues used for the final before 1923 were Kennington Oval, Crystal Palace, Stamford Bridge and Lillie Bridge, all in London, Goodison Park in Liverpool and Fallowfield Stadium and Old Trafford in Manchester. The Millennium Stadium in Cardiff hosted the final for six years (2001–2006), while the new Wembley Stadium was under construction. Other grounds have been used for replays, which until 1999 took place if the initial match ended in a draw. The new Wembley Stadium has been the permanent venue of the final since 2007.

As of 2022, the record for the most wins is held by Arsenal with 14 victories. The cup has been won by the same team in two or more consecutive years on ten occasions, and four teams have won consecutive finals more than once: Wanderers, Blackburn Rovers, Tottenham Hotspur and Arsenal. The cup has been won by a non-English team once: Cardiff City in 1927. The cup is currently held by Liverpool, who defeated Chelsea in the 2022 final.

History

The winners of the first tournament were Wanderers, a team of former public schoolboys based in London, who went on to win the competition five times in its first seven seasons. The early winners of the competition were all teams of wealthy amateurs from the south of England, but in 1883, Blackburn Olympic became the first team from the north to win the cup, defeating Old Etonians. Upon his team's return to Blackburn, Olympic captain Albert Warburton proclaimed: "The Cup is very welcome to Lancashire. It'll have a good home and it'll never go back to London".
 
With the advent of professionalism at around the same time, the amateur teams quickly faded from prominence in the competition. The leading professional clubs formed The Football League in 1888. Since then, one non-league team has won the cup. Tottenham Hotspur, then of the Southern League, defeated Sheffield United of The Football League to win the 1901 final. A year later Sheffield United returned to the final and won the cup, which then remained in the hands of Northern and Midland clubs until Tottenham won it again in 1921. In 1927, Cardiff City, a team which plays in the English football league system despite being based in Wales, won the cup, the only non-English club to do so. Scottish club Queens Park reached the final twice in the early years of the competition.

The competition was not held during the First and Second World Wars, except in the 1914–15 season, when it was completed, and the 1939–40 season, when it was abandoned during the qualifying rounds.

Newcastle United enjoyed a brief spell of FA Cup dominance in the 1950s, winning the trophy three times in five years, and in the 1960s, Tottenham Hotspur enjoyed a similar spell of success, with three wins in seven seasons. This marked the start of a successful period for London-based clubs, with 11 wins in 22 seasons. Teams from the second tier of English football, at the time called the Second Division, experienced an unprecedented run of cup success between 1973 and 1980. Sunderland won the cup in 1973, Southampton repeated the feat in 1976, and West Ham United won in 1980, the most recent victory by a team from outside the top division.

Until 1999, a draw in the final would result in the match being replayed at a later date; since then the final has always been decided on the day, with a penalty shoot-out as required. As of 2022 a penalty shoot-out has been required on only three occasions, in the 2005, 2006 and 2022 finals. Arsenal hold the record for the highest number of FA Cup wins, having claimed the trophy 14 times, most recently in 2020.

Results

 The "Season" column refers to the season the competition was held, and wikilinks to the article about that season.
 The wikilinks in the "Score" column point to the article about that season's final game.

Results by team
Teams shown in italics are no longer in existence. Additionally, Queen's Park ceased to be eligible to enter the FA Cup after a Scottish Football Association ruling in 1887.

See also 
 List of association football competitions

Notes

References

External links
 The FA Cup Archive at TheFA.com
 England FA Challenge Cup Finals at RSSSF.com

FA Cup

FA Cup
FA Cup